The 1977 European Junior Badminton Championships was the fifth edition of the European Junior Badminton Championships. It was held in Ta' Qali, Malta, in the month of April. English players dominated by winning five out of six matches which includes the mixed team championships as well. Danish team won the  Boys' doubles title. Kevin Jolly, the English player who was scheduled to play in three final showdowns suffered foot injury, preventing him from contesting all the matches. Thus, matches for only Girls' singles and Girls' doubles were played on final day. The large-scale final day had to be saved with some show matches.  In these show matches, Sweden's Ulf Johansson beat Andy Goode, England, who was named champion in singles, while Jesper and Niels in doubles beat Nigel Tier & Gary Reeves, England, 18-13, 15-11.

Medalists

Results

Semi-finals

Final

Medal table

References 

European Junior Badminton Championships
European Junior Badminton Championships
European Junior Badminton Championships
International sports competitions hosted by Malta